This is the discography of American rapper Trae tha Truth from Houston, Texas.

Albums

Studio albums

Collaborative albums

EPs

Mixtapes

Singles

As lead artist

Guest appearances

References

Discographies of American artists